OK Orchestra (stylized in all uppercase) is the fourth studio album by American pop band AJR. It was released on March 26, 2021, by the band's own label AJR Productions. The album was produced by group member Ryan Met. The album features the Blue Man Group on the song “Ordinaryish People”, making OK Orchestra AJR's second album to feature another artist.

Promotion and release
In February 2020, AJR released the album's first single, "Bang!", which became one of the trio's biggest hits ever in 2021 and in there entire music time playing. The single was originally intended as a track for a deluxe version of Neotheater, however this never came to fruition, and the song eventually became the lead single for the forthcoming album. On August 31, 2020 they released the album's second single, "Bummerland", a song about the band sarcastically expressing their feelings on the COVID-19 pandemic. On December 20, 2020, they announced that OK Orchestra would be the name of their upcoming album, while also releasing the third single from the album, "My Play". It was put up for pre-order on iTunes/Apple Music and showed that the album contained 13 tracks. AJR released the album's fourth single "Way Less Sad" and its music video on February 17, 2021, On March 21, 2021, AJR launched OKO World, an interactive experience playable on their official website. AJR released a music video for "OK Overture" and "World's Smallest Violin" the same day the album was released. On June 23, almost three months later, they released a music video for "3 O'Clock Things". Two months afterwards on August 12, a music video for "Christmas in June" was released which featured footage filmed at the Wonderstruck Festival in Cleveland. On February 9, 2022, AJR released a music video for "Ordinaryish People feat. Blue Man Group".

Tour Dates

Critical reception
A.D. Amorosi of Variety described the album as "harmonically vocalized, hyper-memoir-centric, atmospheric mélange of pop, hip-hop, and doo-wop with quirky rhythms and a salting of smart-assed They Might Be Giants for tart taste". In a review for AllMusic, Matt Collar wrote that "OK Orchestra isn't just full of hit-worthy pop hooks, it's stage-worthy, ambitious, and full of insights driven by AJR's personal experience", rating the album 4/5. Thomas Stremfel of Spectrum Culture received the album less positively, rating the album 1.25/5 and stating that "hearing the terrible production and cringe-inducing songwriting of OK Orchestra without warning makes for an undeniably engaging listen... Year-end album lists should be filing restraining orders against this album, but that doesn't mean you can't listen to it for a cheap laugh."

Accolades 
The album was nominated for Top Rock Album at the 2022 Billboard Music Awards alongside other bands Twenty One Pilots, Coldplay, and Imagine Dragons.

Commercial performance
OK Orchestra debuted at number 10 on the US Billboard 200 dated April 10, 2021, becoming AJR's second top-10 album. It earned 32,000 album-equivalent units, including 13,000 pure album sales. Although OK Orchestra placed at number 55 on the midweek UK Albums Chart dated March 29, 2021, it did not place in the final listing on April 2. Much of the album's popularity has been contributed to the singles "Bang!", "Way Less Sad", and "World's Smallest Violin".

Track listing

Personnel
Credits adapted from Tidal.

AJR
 Jack Met – lead vocals, instruments
 Adam Met – vocals, instruments
 Ryan Met – vocals, production , instruments , programming 

Additional personnel

 Alba Avoricani – additional vocals 
 Arnetta Johnson - Trumpets 
 Emelia Suljic - violin 
 Ruth Kornblatt-Stier - cello 
 Danny Ferenbach – violin , trumpet 
 JJ Kirkpatrick - trumpet 
 Bas Janssen – trumpet engineer 
 Blue Man Group – ensemble 
 Chris Gehringer – mastering
 Joe Zook – mixing
 Kamila Stankiewicz – artwork
 Chris Cerrato – design
 Jader Souza – design
 Kenny Urban - Beatbox

Charts

Weekly charts

Year-end charts

Certifications

References

2021 albums
AJR (band) albums
Orchestral pop albums
Albums impacted by the COVID-19 pandemic